Thanjai Selvi is a Tamil singer. She is popular for her rendering of folk songs. She had begun her career in Tamil cinema with the song "Jilla Vittu" from the movie Eesan.

Discography
Thanjai Selvi has so far sung the following songs. Jilla Vittu from Easan (won Vijay Award for best folk song that year) and Maruthani from Marudhavelu are popular ones.

Soundtrack

References

External links
 Thanjai Selvi Speaks about Easan

Living people
Tamil playback singers
Indian women playback singers
Indian women folk singers
Indian folk singers
Place of birth missing (living people)
Year of birth missing (living people)